The Bryn Gwyn Stones or Bryn Gwyn Standing Stones are neolithic stones in Brynsiencyn on Anglesey.

Description and History 

An account of 1797 says that "ignorant country people supposing money was hid under them tore them up" and today only two stones, one slab and one pillar, stand in a modern field bank. Nothing else is visible on the ground, but a 2008 excavation found three pits of standing stones, two containing stone stumps, consistent with the record by Rowlands. Further excavations in 2010 identified the pits of three more removed standing stones, making seven identified in all of the eight expected to make up the original circle.

The pit of a further stone, inside the circle, shows it was a 'blade-style' stone, with an alignment with the summer solstice sunrise and winter solstice sunset. A public footpath runs past the stones from Bryngwyn-mawr on the A4080 road, continuing north-east on a low ridge past Castell Bryn Gwyn and some 800 metres further to Caer Lêb. From the Bryn Gwyn Stones the midsummer sun rises over the centre of Castell Bryn Gwyn.

In the 18th century a cottage was built with the wide stone as its end wall. Notches round its top show where roof timbers had been fitted. With the removal of the cottage (which had occupied an area inside the stone circle) the stones were used as a gateway through the field hedge.

Further to the north-east at Tre'r Dryw Bach, another large stone circle was reported by 18th century visitors but has since been cleared away.

See also
List of Scheduled Monuments in Anglesey
List of stone circles
Castell Bryn Gwyn
Archaeology of Wales

References

External links

Prehistoric sites in Anglesey
Bronze Age sites in Wales
Cadw
Stone Age sites in Wales
Megalithic monuments in Wales
Stone circles in Wales
Llanidan
Scheduled monuments in Anglesey
Welsh artefacts